Bernardo Calderón Cabrera (October 16, 1922 in Mexico City – December 21, 2003 in  Mexico City) was a Mexican architect.

Biography 
Calderón studied at the Escuela Nacional de Arquitectura (ENA) of the Universidad Nacional Autónoma de México (UNAM) from 1940 to 1945, where he later taught from 1947 to May 2003. In 1980 he graduated as Master of Architecture.

He worked together with Manuel Ortiz Monasterio, and later with his brother José Luis. His works included several notable buildings, amongst others the seat of the faculty of architecture in the UNAM's Ciudad Universitaria, as well as restorations of larger churches in his hometown.

References 

Mexican architects
People from Mexico City
National Autonomous University of Mexico alumni
Academic staff of the National Autonomous University of Mexico
1922 births
2003 deaths